The 2011 Liga de Fútbol Profesional Boliviano season (official known as the 2011 Campeonato ENTEL Fundadores de la LFPB for sponsorship reasons) was the 35th season of LFPB. Originally comprising two tournaments, the 2011 season was the first single-stage season since 2005. This was to change the calendar to European calendar like Argentina, Venezuela and Uruguay. The 2011 fixtures were released on January 7, 2011. The season began on January 15 ended on June 22. There was no relegation. Oriente Petrolero was the defending champion.

Teams
The number of teams for 2011 remains the same. Jorge Wilstermann finished last in the 2010 relegation table and was relegated to the  Bolivian Football Regional Leagues for the first time since the club was founded. They were replaced by the 2010 Copa Simón Bolívar champion Nacional Potosí, who last played in the LFPB in 2009.

Standings

Results

Top goalscorers
Source:'''

References

External links
 Official website of the LFPB 
 Official regulations 

2011
1